The 2007 European Grand Prix (formally the 2007 Formula 1 Grand Prix of Europe) was a Formula One motor race held at Nürburgring, Nürburg, Germany on 22 July 2007. It was the tenth race of the 2007 FIA Formula One World Championship. The 60-lap race was won by Fernando Alonso driving for the McLaren team after starting from second position. Felipe Massa finished second for Ferrari with Mark Webber third in a Red Bull Racing car.

As a consequence of the race, Alonso reduced the World Drivers' Championship lead of his teammate Lewis Hamilton down to two points; in the Constructors' Championship, McLaren extended their lead over Ferrari to twenty-seven points.

Report

Background
On 29 August 2006 it was announced that the European Grand Prix had been removed from the F1 calendar for the 2007 season. Since then there has only been one GP hosted in Germany each year, alternating between Hockenheimring and Nürburgring. However, the name for this Grand Prix was in doubt. While originally thought to be the German Grand Prix from 2007, the title was later changed to "Großer Preis von Europa" (European Grand Prix), because the Hockenheimring held the naming rights for "German Grand Prix" and they could not reach an agreement to share the naming rights. It was the first time since 1960 that a Formula One World Championship race had not been held under the name "German Grand Prix".

Lewis Hamilton entered the race as Drivers' Championship leader (and due to his 12-point lead over team-mate Fernando Alonso he would keep his championship lead regardless of the race result).

Murray Walker provided radio commentary to listeners in the UK on BBC Radio 5 Live – the first time he had provided UK coverage of an F1 event since retiring in 2001.

Christijan Albers did not drive for Spyker F1 due to his failure to pay sponsorship money. His replacement was German driver Markus Winkelhock, son of former Formula One driver Manfred Winkelhock. This was the last race for Toro Rosso driver Scott Speed who was later replaced by BMW Sauber test driver Sebastian Vettel.

During the weeks leading up to the race it was announced that McLaren would appear in front of the FIA on 26 July regarding claims they had received information from Ferrari. Lewis Hamilton said he was confident it would go well.

As a tribute to the passengers of TAM Airlines Flight 3054, Felipe Massa had a black stripe on his helmet in memory of the victims. Rubens Barrichello also had stripes on his helmet, and Red Bull drivers David Coulthard and Mark Webber had small Brazilian flags on their helmets in reference to the accident.

Qualifying
Kimi Räikkönen overtook Felipe Massa during the final minute of qualifying and Fernando Alonso pushed him further down into third. The final session of qualifying was delayed for half an hour when Lewis Hamilton crashed into the barriers due to a wheel gun failure which caused the wheel to not be secured on the car. The wheel rubbed against the car, destroying the wheel and tyre, and sending the car into the wall. His time from the "fuel-burn" phase of Q3 was not good enough to elevate him higher than 10th position. Toyota had a strong qualifying with both drivers making it into the top 10, ending up 8th and 9th. Mark Webber qualified an excellent 6th just in front of Renault's Heikki Kovalainen and behind the two BMWs.

As for the rest of the field, Giancarlo Fisichella endured a miserable session qualifying with a poor 13th, which was incidentally the same place he had qualified for the previous year's race. Red Bull had mistakenly let David Coulthard out too late from the pits in Q1 which led him to be stuck back in 20th place, only ahead of the two Spykers of Adrian Sutil and debutant Markus Winkelhock who had not been expected to do much better.

Race
The race started dry, but rain was expected, and at the start of the warm-up lap, an imminent downpour was predicted. Markus Winkelhock for Spyker pitted for wet tyres, the only driver to do so, starting the race from the pit lane as a result. The Ferraris led into the first corner as a pair with Alonso trailing in third. Lewis Hamilton, meanwhile, coming back from his 10th-place qualifying, was up to sixth at the first corner, but after a collision between the two BMWs, Hamilton received a puncture, causing him to fall back into the rest of the pack.

During the first lap it started to rain, sooner and more heavily than most teams had expected. A number of drivers lost control, and many pitted at the end of the lap to change into intermediate-weather tyres. Leader Kimi Räikkönen attempted to pit, but lost grip and ran wide, having to do an extra lap on dry tyres and dropping to seventh place. Winkelhock thus found himself in the lead as a result of his early gamble, the first time that a Spyker had led a Grand Prix.

Some drivers had stayed out in the hope that the rain would stop, but it worsened, such that full wet tyres were required, rather than intermediates. Winkelhock had a huge advantage as the only driver on the right tyres, and led the race by 33 seconds ahead of Felipe Massa and Fernando Alonso, who had pitted at the end of lap one along with other drivers. By the start of lap three, the weather had become so bad that water was flowing round turn 1 and was nicknamed the 'turn 1 river'.

Jenson Button had moved up from a mid-grid position to 4th despite coming in on the 1st lap to change tyres. However, he spun off into the wall at the start of the 3rd lap, quickly followed by Lewis Hamilton who locked up. Adrian Sutil had a huge spin into the same place as Button and Hamilton and just missed both of them as he hit the wall. Nico Rosberg and Scott Speed also went off at turn 1. Anthony Davidson then locked up at the "river" but stopped his car just before the gravel and was able to reverse out. The safety car was brought out, just as Vitantonio Liuzzi spun off at high speed. The gravel trap slowed him and he gently tapped a recovery tractor. Hamilton had kept his engine running after his spin and was hoisted back on the circuit to continue a lap down. Not long after the safety car was deployed, race director Charlie Whiting decided the conditions were too dangerous to continue, and the race was red flagged. It was the first race to be stopped since the 2003 Brazilian Grand Prix, when a crash by Fernando Alonso halted the race, and the first race to be red-flagged and then restarted since the 2001 Belgian Grand Prix.

At about 2:20 p.m. local time the rain stopped and the drivers were pushed on to the starting grid, in the order that they were one lap before the red flag. Jenson Button, Adrian Sutil, Nico Rosberg, Scott Speed and Vitantonio Liuzzi did not take the restart as they all aquaplaned off the track at turn one on lap three, causing the red flag.

The race restarted under safety car conditions, with an agreement that after one and a half minutes, any lapped cars would be allowed to overtake all the cars in front (including the safety car) and unlap themselves. The only lapped car was that of Lewis Hamilton, who unlapped himself and then pitted to change to dry tyres, a gamble which did not pay off due to the track still being too wet. When the safety car returned to the pit, race leader Markus Winkelhock lost the lead very early on after another gamble, keeping wet weather tyres on while everybody else was on the more suitable intermediate tyre, in the hope that further rain would fall. It would not and eventually he was forced into retirement after a hydraulic failure on lap 15. Winkelhock had only driven the Spyker for a total of three days before the race, and had not previously experienced wet weather in a Formula One car. Takuma Sato and Ralf Schumacher also retired, Schumacher after a collision with Nick Heidfeld who continued. Pole position holder Kimi Räikkönen also retired due to mechanical problems while catching up to the leaders running third.

From then onwards, the track dried out, and the faster Ferrari of Massa led Fernando Alonso. Mark Webber was in third with Alexander Wurz chasing him hard.  But on lap 52, more rain fell, and all drivers except for Lewis Hamilton pitted for intermediate tyres. Hamilton managed to get up to a points position of eighth, before eventually having to pit, dropping him back down to tenth. Fernando Alonso's McLaren performed well in the conditions, and he passed Massa on lap 56 around the outside at turn five, making contact as he did so. He proceeded to win the race, taking McLaren's first win at the Nürburgring since 1998, on the 80th anniversary of the first Grand Prix at the Nürburgring. Massa trailed him by 8.1 seconds. The final podium position was claimed by Mark Webber in the Red Bull, over a minute behind the leader. Alexander Wurz, David Coulthard, Nick Heidfeld, Robert Kubica and Heikki Kovalainen, who had gambled on putting intermediate tyres on early and fell from fifth position to eighth, completed the points positions. Red Bull earned ten points to move past Toyota in the Constructors' Championship into sixth. Hamilton finished the race in ninth place, the first time in his debut season that he had finished outside the points-scoring positions. Alonso and Massa had a heated argument before the podium ceremony, over their collision in the final part of the race.

Classification

Qualifying

Race

Championship standings after the race 

Drivers' Championship standings

Constructors' Championship standings

Note: Only the top five positions are included for both sets of standings.

See also 
 2007 Nürburgring GP2 Series round

References

External links

 Official Formula1.com page
 Detailed European Grand Prix results

European Grand Prix
European Grand Prix
European Grand Prix
Sport in Rhineland-Palatinate
July 2007 sports events in Europe